Inácio Saure, I.M.C. (born 2 March 1960) is a Mozambican prelate of the Catholic Church who has been Archbishop of Nampula since 2017. He was the Bishop of Tete from 2011 to 2017 and is a member of the Consolata Missionaries.

Biography
Inácio Saure was born on 2 March 1960 in Balama, Mozambique. After the outbreak of civil war in Mozambique, he entered the Consolata Seminary in Maputo. He attended courses in philosophy and theology in the seminary of St. Augustine in Matola from 1990 to 1992, and continued his theological studies in the Democratic Republic of the Congo (DROC) at the Superior Institute of Theology of St. Eugene of Mazenod in Kinshasa, earning his bachelor's degree in sacred theology in 1998. He made his first vows as a member of the Consolata Mission Institute on 7 January 1995 and his perpetual vows on 15 May 1998. He was ordained a priest on 8 December 1998.

From 1999 to 2001 he was Parish Vicar of the Parish of S. Makusa Lukunga in Kinshasa; from 2002 to 2005 Pastor of the Mater Dei Parish and Superior of the Community in Mont Ngafula in the DROC; then Director of the Computer Science School and Regional Vice Superior; and in 2006 in Mozambique worked in the field of training; from 2006 to 2007 studied Italian in Rome and then followed a course for Novice Masters at the Mater Christi Institute in Bobo-Dioulasso in Burkina Faso. From 2008 to 2011 he was Rector of the Middle and Philosophical Seminary of the Consolata Missionaries in Matola and Novice Master at the Consolata International Novitiate in Maputo.

On 12 April 2011, Pope Benedict XVI appointed him Bishop of Tete. He received his episcopal consecration on 22 May from Lucio Andrice Muandula, Bishop of Xai-Xai, and was installed on 5 June.

On 11 April 2017, Pope Francis named him Archbishop of Nampula, and he was installed there on 11 June.

He was elected to a three-year term as president of the Episcopal Conference of Mozambique in November 2022.

See also
Catholic Church in Mozambique

References

21st-century Roman Catholic bishops in Mozambique
1960 births
Living people
People from Cabo Delgado Province
Roman Catholic bishops of Tete
Mozambican Roman Catholic archbishops